Paul Percival "Ray" Brown (January 31, 1889 - May 29, 1955) was a right-handed pitcher in Major League Baseball for the Chicago Cubs.

Brown pitched in just one big-league game, twirling a complete-game victory over the Philadelphia Phillies on September 29, 1909, at age 20. He allowed just five hits to the Phillies, walking four and striking out two in his single day on the mound at West Side Park. At the plate, he had no hits in three at-bats, but did earn a run batted in. By virtue of his brief moment in the spotlight, Brown became the tenth-youngest man to play in the National League in 1909.

References

1889 births
1955 deaths
Chicago Cubs players
Major League Baseball pitchers
Moose Jaw Robin Hoods players
Sioux City Packers players
Baseball players from Chicago